Darvazeh may refer to:
 Darvazeh, Hamadan (دروازه - Darvāzeh)
 Darvazeh, Lorestan (داروزه - Dārvazeh)

See also
Derweze (Darvaza), Turkemenistan